Kickapoo is an unincorporated community in Kickapoo Township, Peoria County, Illinois, United States.

It was named after the Kickapoo people.

References

Unincorporated communities in Peoria County, Illinois
Unincorporated communities in Illinois
Peoria metropolitan area, Illinois